Smyril may refer to: 

Smyril Line
MS Smyril